The 1972 Independent Press-Telegram Championships was a women's tennis tournament played on indoor carpet courts at the Long Beach City College Gym in Long Beach, California in the United States that was part of the 1972 WT Pro Tour. It was the second edition of the tournament and was held from January 19 through January 13, 1972. A capacity crowd of 2,200 spectators watched second-seeded Rosemary Casals win the singles title and earn $3,400 first-prize money.

Finals

Singles
 Rosemary Casals defeated  Françoise Dürr 6–2, 6–7(4–5), 6–3

Doubles
 Rosemary Casals /  Virginia Wade defeated  Helen Gourlay /  Karen Krantzcke 6–4, 5–7, 7–5

Prize money

References

1972 Women's Tennis Circuit
1972
1972 in sports in California
1972 in American tennis
January 1972 sports events in the United States